Krasny Yar may refer to:
Krasny Yar (inhabited locality), name of several inhabited localities in Russia
Krasny Yar Krasnoyarsk, a Russian rugby union club based in Krasnoyarsk